Marek Paweł Muszyński (born 23 January 1947 in Lublin) is a Polish politician, a member of Law and Justice party. He was elected to Sejm on 25 September 2005.

References

1947 births
Living people
Politicians from Lublin
Law and Justice politicians
University of Wrocław alumni
21st-century Polish politicians